The International Student Identity Card (ISIC) is an internationally accepted proof of student status. This ID verifies students and grants them access to a diverse selection of benefits and discounts around the world. With the ISIC card a student may redeem discounts for travel, accommodation, visiting cultural institutions and other various benefits. The ISIC Association also issues the International Youth Travel Card (IYTC) for non-students, and the International Teacher Identity Card (ITIC) for teachers and professors. The membership fee varies country by country.

ISIC Association
The ISIC Association is a non-profit membership organisation legally registered in Denmark.

The ISIC card is administered and managed at a global level by the ISIC Service Office d.o.o. The ISIC Service Office d.o.o is a company seated in Belgrade, Serbia. The ISIC Service Office d.o.o is wholly owned by the ISIC Association.

ISIC card distribution
ISIC Exclusive Representatives, who have the exclusive rights to issue ISIC cards in their respective countries, make up a global distribution network for ISIC cards. The ISIC card is available in over 130 countries. In each country, the ISIC Exclusive Representative is exclusively responsible for ISIC card distribution, promotion and development, including the development and managing a portfolio of local and national benefits and discounts, and services available to the ISIC holders.

ISIC card today
Eligibility for an ISIC card is restricted to bona fide students engaged in higher or tertiary education and students in full-time secondary education. Students must be a minimum of 12 years old to be eligible. There is no upper age limit for an ISIC card.

An ISIC card is valid for 16 months. The validity period of an ISIC card corresponds to the academic year in the country of purchase. For example, in countries where the academic year starts in September (e.g. countries in the Northern Hemisphere), the ISIC card is generally valid from 1 September to 31 December the following year. In countries where the academic year begins in February (e.g. countries in the Southern Hemisphere), the ISIC card is valid from 1 February through to 30 May, 16 months later.

Brand refresh
The idea to conduct an ISIC Brand refresh originated in 2017, and was subsequently launched in May 2019.

Endorsement & Alliances of the ISIC

UNESCO Endorsement
The United Nations Educational, Scientific and Cultural Organization (UNESCO) has been involved in the ISIC development almost since the beginning. UNESCO joined the International Student Travel Conference in 1995 and supported the ISIC card. In 1968 UNESCO issued an official endorsement in full support of the ISIC card. UNESCO recognised the ISIC card as the only internationally accepted proof of full-time student status and a unique document encouraging cultural exchange and international understanding. A renewed Memorandum of Understanding was signed in 1993. The UNESCO logo has appeared on the ISIC card since 1993. UNESCO recognises the ISIC card as a unique document encouraging cultural exchange and international understanding.

British Council and Global Study Awards
This exciting initiative was launched by the British Council IELTS, Studyportals and the ISIC Association in 2015. The goal of these annual awards is to encourage and support more student undertake study abroad. This award is available in all counties worldwide. In total there have been 17 winners in 5 rounds

Other Global Endorsement
AIESEC
Community of Andean Nations
International Association of Universities
International Pharmaceutical Federation
European Students' Union
 European Law Students' Association (ELSA)
 European Youth Card Association (EYCA)
 World Youth Student Education Travel Confederation (WYSETC)
Hosteling International Partnership (HIP)
World Savings Banks Institute (WSBI)

Strategic global partners
Mastercard
British Council    
Education First
FlixBus
Hard Rock Café
The Economist
Homestay	
Hostelsclub
Hostelworld	
Hotels.com
Lonely Planet
SANDEMANs	
Withlocals

ISIC Event
The ISIC Event

References

External links
 ISIC website
 ISIC Association website

Identity documents
International education industry
Student travel